Natasha Kanani Janine Kai (born May 22, 1983) is an American professional soccer forward and Olympic gold medalist. She previously played for Sky Blue FC and the Philadelphia Independence of Women's Professional Soccer and National Women's Soccer League as well as the United States women's national soccer team. In 2011, Kai was also part of the first US women's rugby union sevens team to play in the IRB Women's Sevens Challenge Cup held in Dubai.

Early life

University of Hawaiʻi
Kai played for the University of Hawaiʻi Rainbow Wahine from 2002 to 2005.  She was named WAC player of the Year in 2002, 2003, and 2005, and was named a third-team All American in 2003.

During Kai's standout career, she set multiple WAC records.  She was named WAC Freshman of the Year in 2002, becoming the first soccer player to be named Freshman and Player of the Year in the same season. She also became the first player in WAC history to earn three Player of the Year awards and First-Team all-conference honors all four seasons.  Kai owns the WAC career shots record (446) and is second in goals (72) and points (162). She finished her college career with 72 goals in 73 matches.

Playing career

Women's Professional Soccer league

Sky Blue FC
On September 16, 2008 the initial WPS player allocation was conducted; Kai was allocated to Sky Blue FC with fellow US Women's National Team players Heather O'Reilly and Christie Rampone. Kai's electrifying play on offense was key in Sky Blue FC's 2009 WPS championship season.

Philadelphia Independence
On December 21, 2010, Kai signed a deal to play with the Philadelphia Independence. On July 6 she scored a hat trick against her former team, Sky Blue FC.

National Women's Soccer League

Washington Spirit
In February 2013, Kai was selected during round four (25th overall) of the 2013 NWSL Supplemental Draft for the inaugural season of National Women's Soccer League. According to a press release of the Spirit, she was recovering from a knee injury, and was expected to begin play around the start of the 2013 NWSL season. Kai never played for the Washington Spirit.

Sky Blue FC
On February 11, 2016 Sky Blue FC announced the signing of Kai for 2016 season. She played through the full season scoring 4 goals before getting surgery on her left ankle for a reoccurring injury on September 26, 2016.

United Women's Soccer

Los Angeles Galaxy OC
Kai joined LA Galaxy Orange County, a team in the United Women's Soccer league, in 2019. Her first appearance was on June 30, 2019. She scored a goal for the team in its 2019 UWS playoffs match against the Houston Aces on July 13, 2019.

International

Youth team
Kai was first brought in with the U.S. U-21 Women's National Team in 2004, and was the leading scorer in the team with 12 goals, including six in international matches. She helped lead the U-21s to the Nordic Cup title in Iceland, scoring three goals in the tournament including two against Germany. She injured her shoulder in her final college game of 2004, then re-injured it again in her first U-21 camp of 2005, necessitating surgery, and did not get called into an U-21 camp until January 2006.

Senior team
Kai started her first training camp with the full United States Women's National Soccer Team in February 2006.  She made her full Women's National Team debut at the 2006 Algarve Cup in Portugal, scoring in her first two games against Denmark and France, as a substitute.  She became just the fourth player in U.S. WNT history to score in her first two caps.

Kai scored four goals in her first seven WNT matches, including the winner in a 1–0 victory over Japan on May 9, 2006. She went on to become the first-ever player from Hawaii to play for the full Women's National Team and to make a Women's World Cup Team. She played in 17 games during her first year on the National Team, starting in four matches. She scored six goals, two of them in the 2006 Algarve Cup. She also scored against Japan, Ireland, Canada and Australia. Her goal against the Matildas came in a 2–0 win at the Peace Cup in South Korea.

In 2007, Kai played in seven games heading into the final pre-Women's World Cup match, starting in four. She had two assists and one goal that came in a 2–0 win over China at the Four Nations Tournament to give USA the tournament title. She was one of the final three players chosen to the 2007 U.S. Women's World Cup Team.

At the 2008 Summer Olympics in Beijing, Kai scored the winning goal in overtime to lead the U.S. past Canada in the quarterfinal round.

Kai last played for the U.S. on March 11, 2009 against Sweden. She has not been selected for national team duty since having major shoulder surgery in the fall of 2009.

In September 2011 via Twitter, Kai said she would never play for the Women's National Team again, stating, "I will never play for the USWNT ever again so Id appreciate it if u stop asking & tweeting me about it. Its in the past & staying there thx"

International goals

Rugby
Kai was part of the US women's rugby union sevens team to the first IRB Women's Sevens Challenge Cup held in Dubai 2011.

Personal life
At five years old, Kai accidentally stepped on a glass bottle and the tendons in her foot were severely damaged.  Doctors were afraid she might never be able to run again, but she fully recovered from the injury.

She is also known for her distinctive tattoos. She has over 60 tattoos two being "Sleeve tattoos" on her left and right arms. She has tattoos on both legs, arms, feet, and hands, and on her back, chest, sides, and the front, side, and back of her neck. Along with the tattoos, she also has two lower lip piercings.

She was featured on an episode of the hit show LA Ink and had a large spread in ESPN The Magazines "Body Issue".

Kai has openly discussed the fact that she is lesbian, and was one of only three openly gay individuals on the 2008 USA Summer Olympic Team.  During an interview with NBCOlympics.com, Kai was quoted as saying the following:
It was a hard time... I had missed the first camp under new head coach Pia Sundhage in early-January because I had bronchitis, and I was going through a nasty break-up with my girlfriend. Then Coach Sundhage told me my job was on the line.
Kai describes herself as being free-spirited and puts full pride in to her lesbianism.

ReferencesMatch reports'

External links
 
 US Soccer player profile
 Sky Blue FC player profile
 Philadelphia Independence player profile
 Hawaii Rainbow Wahine profile
 

1983 births
Living people
American Youth Soccer Organization players
American sportspeople of Filipino descent
American women's soccer players
Footballers at the 2008 Summer Olympics
Hawaii Rainbow Wahine soccer players
LGBT Native Hawaiians
American LGBT sportspeople
Olympic gold medalists for the United States in soccer
People from Honolulu County, Hawaii
American people of Native Hawaiian descent
Native Hawaiian people of Filipino descent
Native Hawaiian sportspeople
Philadelphia Independence players
Soccer players from Hawaii
Sportspeople from Hawaii
United States women's international soccer players
Lesbian sportswomen
LGBT association football players
American female rugby union players
American rugby sevens players
American female rugby sevens players
Female rugby sevens players
LGBT rugby union players
Medalists at the 2008 Summer Olympics
LGBT people from Hawaii
2007 FIFA Women's World Cup players
Women's association football forwards
NJ/NY Gotham FC players
National Women's Soccer League players
Hawaii people of Chinese descent
Women's Professional Soccer players